Quercegrossa is a village in Tuscany, central Italy, administratively a frazione of the comuni of Castelnuovo Berardenga and Monteriggioni, province of Siena. Quercegrossa is about 12 km from Siena.

It is the birthplace of artist Jacopo della Quercia.

Main sights 
 Santi Giacomo e Niccolò, main parish church of the village

References 

Frazioni of Monteriggioni
Frazioni of Castelnuovo Berardenga